Parliamentary elections were held in Tokelau on 17 January, 18 January and 19 January 2008 to elect the 20 members of the General Fono. The elections saw Kolouei O'Brien replaced as faipule of Fakaofo by Foua Toloa.

References

See also
Administrator of Tokelau
Council for the Ongoing Government of Tokelau

Elections in Tokelau
General
2008 elections in Oceania